Bazzano may refer to:

Places 
 , a frazione of L'Aquila in the Italian region Abruzzo
 , a frazione of the commune Neviano degli Arduini in the Italian province of Parma
 Bazzano, Valsamoggia, a frazione and commune seat of Valsamoggia in the Italian region Emilia-Romagna
 Bazzano Island, a small, uninhabited island in Antarctica

People 
 Charlie Bazzano (1923–2014), Australian cyclist
 , Uruguayan footballer